Spring in Berlin is a 1957 West German romantic comedy film directed by Arthur Maria Rabenalt and starring Sonja Ziemann, Gerhard Riedmann, and Gardy Granass. It was shot at the Tempelhof Studios in Berlin and on location across the city. The film's sets were designed by the art directors Hans Kuhnert and Wilhelm Vorwerg.

Cast

References

External links

West German films
German romantic comedy films
1957 romantic comedy films
Films directed by Arthur Maria Rabenalt
Films shot in Berlin
Films set in Berlin
1950s German-language films
1950s German films
Films shot at Tempelhof Studios